The 2023 Metro Atlantic Athletic Conference men's basketball tournament was the postseason men's basketball tournament for the Metro Atlantic Athletic Conference for the 2022–23 NCAA Division I men's basketball season. The tournament was played March 7–11, 2023, at the Jim Whelan Boardwalk Hall in Atlantic City, New Jersey, for the fourth year in a row. The tournament winner received the conference's automatic bid to the 2023 NCAA Division I men's basketball tournament. The defending champions were the Saint Peter's Peacocks.

Seeds
All 11 teams in the conference participated in the Tournament. The top five teams received byes to the quarterfinals. Teams were seeded by record within the conference, with a tiebreaker system to seed teams with identical conference records.

Schedule

Bracket

* denotes number of overtimes

Game summaries

First round

Team and tournament leaders

Team leaders

All-championship team

See also
 2023 MAAC women's basketball tournament

References

Tournament
2023
College basketball tournaments in New Jersey
Sports competitions in Atlantic City, New Jersey
MAAC men's basketball tournament
MAAC men's basketball tournament